Jamison Battle (born May 10, 2001) is an American college basketball player for the Minnesota Golden Gophers of the Big Ten Conference. He previously played for the George Washington Colonials.

High school career
Battle played basketball for DeLaSalle High School in Minneapolis, Minnesota, where he was teammates with Tyrell Terry. As a senior, he averaged 21.2 points and nine rebounds per game, helping his team win the Class 3A state title.

College career
As a freshman at George Washington, Battle averaged 11.8 points and 5.2 rebounds per game, and was named to the Atlantic 10 All-Rookie Team. He set a program single-season record with 89 three-pointers, which also led the conference. On January 3, 2021, Battle posted a career-high 29 points and seven rebounds in a 75–73 win against Duquesne. As a sophomore, he averaged 17.3 points and 5.2 rebounds per game, earning Third Team All-Atlantic 10 honors. For his junior season, Battle transferred to Minnesota to play under first-year head coach Ben Johnson. He was named Honorable Mention All-Big Ten.

Career statistics

College

|-
| style="text-align:left;"| 2019–20
| style="text-align:left;"| George Washington
| 32 || 30 || 35.3 || .399 || .366 || .846 || 5.2 || .6 || .4 || .4 || 11.8
|-
| style="text-align:left;"| 2020–21
| style="text-align:left;"| George Washington
| 15 || 15 || 36.5 || .475 || .354 || .787 || 5.2 || .7 || .9 || .3 || 17.3
|- class="sortbottom"
| style="text-align:center;" colspan="2"| Career
| 47 || 45 || 35.7 || .429 || .363 || .818 || 5.2 || .6 || .6 || .4 || 13.5

Personal life
Battle's father, Terrell, played college basketball for Winston-Salem State and is a general manager at Life Time Fitness. His younger half-sister, Amaya, played basketball for Hopkins High School and now also plays for Minnesota.

References

External links
Minnesota Golden Gophers bio
George Washington Colonials bio

2001 births
Living people
American men's basketball players
Basketball players from Minnesota
People from Robbinsdale, Minnesota
Small forwards
George Washington Colonials men's basketball players
Minnesota Golden Gophers men's basketball players
DeLaSalle High School (Minneapolis) alumni